María del Carmen Herrera Gomez (born 26 September 1974 in Málaga), commonly known as Carmen Herrera, is a judo athlete from Spain.

Personal 
Herrera has visual impairment and is a B3 classified sportsperson. In December 2013, she attended an event marking Spanish insurance company Santa Lucía Seguros becoming a sponsor of the Spanish Paralympic Committee, and consequently Plan ADOP which funds high performance Spanish disability sport competitors.  She chose to attend the event because she wanted to show support for this type of sponsorship.

Judo 
She competed in judo at the 2004 Summer Paralympics, 2008 Summer Paralympics and 2012 Summer Paralympics. She was won a gold in the Up to 70 kg women's group at the 2004, 2008 and 2012 Games.  In 2013, she was working to qualify for the 2016 Summer Paralympics.

In October 2011, she competed in a regional Spanish national vision impaired judo event in Guadalajara. In November 2013, she competed in the Open Judo Tournament Guadalajara in the women's less than 70 kilos group.

References

External links 
  (2004)
  (2008, 2012)
 

1974 births
Living people
Spanish female judoka
Paralympic judoka of Spain
Paralympic gold medalists for Spain
Paralympic medalists in judo
Visually impaired category Paralympic competitors
Judoka at the 2004 Summer Paralympics
Judoka at the 2008 Summer Paralympics
Judoka at the 2012 Summer Paralympics
Medalists at the 2004 Summer Paralympics
Medalists at the 2008 Summer Paralympics
Medalists at the 2012 Summer Paralympics
Sportspeople from Málaga
Plan ADOP alumni
21st-century Spanish women
Spanish blind people